Kirby Cote (born April 29, 1984) is a blind Canadian Paralympic swimmer.

Career
Cote first competed for Canada at the 2000 Summer Paralympics in Sydney, where she won gold in both the 100 metre breaststroke SB13 and the 200 metre individual medley SM13 setting new world record times of 1:19.43 and 2:29.59 respectively. Cote also took silver in the 50 metre freestyle S13 in 28.80, and in the 100 metre freestyle S13 in 1:02.98.

At the 2002 Commonwealth Games in Manchester, Cote won bronze in the 100 metre EAD freestyle. Competing against swimmers in other classifications, Cote covered the distance in a Games record time of 1:01.76,  1.88 seconds over her target time.

At the 2002 IPC World Championships in Mar del Plata, Argentina, Cote won gold in five events including the 50 metre freestyle S13 in 28.84, the 100 metre freestyle S13 in 1:02.19, the 400 metre freestyle S13 in 4:58.15, the 100 metre breaststroke SB13 in 1:17.89 and the 200 metre individual medley SM13 in 2:30.11.

At the 2004 Summer Paralympics in Athens, Cote won gold in the 50 metre freestyle S13 in 28.47, gold in the 100 metre freestyle S13 in 1:01.74, gold in the 400 metre freestyle S13 in 4:43.23, gold in the 100 metre butterfly S13 in 1:07.44, gold in the 200 metre individual medley SM13 in 2:31.20, silver in the 100 metre backstroke S13 in 1:14.08 and silver in the 100 metre breaststroke SB13 in 1:17.34.

At the 2006 IPC World Championships in Durban, South Africa, Cote won gold in the 100 metre breaststroke SB13 in 1:21.05, 5th in the 50 metre freestyle S13 in 29.02 and 7th in the 100 metre freestyle S13 in 1:03.76.

At the 2008 Summer Paralympics in Beijing, Cote won silver in the 100 metre butterfly S13 in 1:06.62 and in the 200 metre individual medley SM13 in 2:28.65. In other results, Cote finished 4th in the 50 metre freestyle S13 in 28.08 and also finished 4th in the 100 metre freestyle S13 in 28.08.

Cote was inducted into the Manitoba Sports Hall of Fame in 2018.

References

External links 
 

1981 births
Living people
Canadian blind people
Canadian female backstroke swimmers
Canadian female breaststroke swimmers
Canadian female butterfly swimmers
Canadian female freestyle swimmers
Canadian female medley swimmers
Paralympic swimmers of Canada
Paralympic swimmers with a vision impairment
Paralympic gold medalists for Canada
Paralympic silver medalists for Canada
Commonwealth Games bronze medallists for Canada
Swimmers at the 2002 Commonwealth Games
Swimmers at the 2000 Summer Paralympics
Swimmers at the 2004 Summer Paralympics
Swimmers at the 2008 Summer Paralympics
World record holders in paralympic swimming
Place of birth missing (living people)
Medalists at the 2000 Summer Paralympics
Medalists at the 2004 Summer Paralympics
Medalists at the 2008 Summer Paralympics
S13-classified Paralympic swimmers
Commonwealth Games medallists in swimming
Medalists at the World Para Swimming Championships
Paralympic medalists in swimming
21st-century Canadian women
Medallists at the 2002 Commonwealth Games